The North Texas Knockouts were a team of the Women's Spring Football League set to play in the WSFL's 2012 season. Unfortunately, the Knockouts will not be playing this season. However, it appears that players and coaches have reorganized under the new name of the DFW Xtreme. The DFW Xtreme have agreed to play out the schedule vacated by the North Texas Knockouts. 
 
In their inaugural 2011 season, the Knockouts were members of the Independent Women's Football League. Based in Dallas, the Knockouts played their home games at Sprague Stadium on the campus of Justin F. Kimball High School.

Season-by-season

|-
| colspan="6" align="center" | North Texas Knockouts (IWFL)
|-
|2011 || 5 || 3 || 0 || 2nd East South Atlantic || Lost Tier II Eastern Conference Quarterfinal (Chattanooga)
|-
| colspan="6" align="center" | North Texas Knockouts (WSFL)
|-
|2012* || -- || -- || -- || -- || --
|-
!Totals || 5 || 4 || 0
|colspan="2"|(including playoffs)

* = Current Standing

2011

** = Game won by forfeit

External links 
 

American football teams in the Dallas–Fort Worth metroplex
Women's Spring Football League teams
American football teams established in 2010
American football teams disestablished in 2012
2010 establishments in Texas
2012 disestablishments in Texas
Women's sports in Texas